The women's 800 metres event  at the 1979 European Athletics Indoor Championships was held on 25 February in Vienna.

Results

References

800 metres at the European Athletics Indoor Championships
800
Euro